Neocoenyra duplex is a butterfly in the family Nymphalidae. It is found in southern Ethiopia, Somalia, Kenya, Uganda, Rwanda, the eastern part of the Democratic Republic of the Congo and northern Tanzania. The habitat consists of grassy savanna.

The larvae feed on Poaceae species.

References

Satyrini
Butterflies described in 1886
Butterflies of Africa
Taxa named by Arthur Gardiner Butler